The bluespotted cornetfish (Fistularia commersonii), also known as smooth cornetfish or smooth flutemouth, is a marine fish which belongs to the family Fistulariidae. This very long and slender reef-dweller belongs to the same order as the pipefishes and seahorses, called Syngnathiformes.

Distribution
It is widespread in the tropical and subtropical waters of the Indo-Pacific as far north as Japan and east to the west coasts of the Americas, including the Red Sea. In 2000, its presence was reported in the Mediterranean Sea off Israel. In the past twenty years, this species experienced a population explosion along the Levantine coast and a rapid spread westward, reaching the westernmost sectors of the Mediterranean and as far north as the Gulf of Lions by 2007. At this point, it has been recorded in all Mediterranean sub-basins and is now very common in the eastern part. Scientists have determined that the fish in the Mediterranean are all descended from a small number of ancestors, possibly as a result of a single invasion event, and are not as genetically variable as their conspecifics in the Red Sea.

Morphology

It is notable for its unusually long, slender body shape. It has a tubular snout, large eyes and a long tail filament lined with sensory pores which may help with detecting prey. Its body is greenish-grey to brown with two thin blue stripes or lines of dots on the back and lighter on the front. Its body pattern changes to a broad banded pattern at night.

Biology
The bluespotted cornetfish is usually a solitary predator, stalking and feeding on small fishes, crustaceans, and squid. Sometimes, they feed in small groups along the bottom on small, bottom-dwelling fish which their long snouts are very efficient at sucking up. Reproduction is oviparous. The large eggs hatch and develop outside of the body.

Human relevance
The fish is of minor importance commercially, mostly being sold as fish meal but also fresh and preserved.  It is also sold as an aquarium fish.

Name
The specific name honours the French botanist Philibert Commerson (1727-1773).

References

External links
 DORIS
 Sous les mers
 WoRMS
 Fishbase
 

bluespotted cornetfish
Taxa named by Eduard Rüppell
bluespotted cornetfish